Pamela is a feminine given name, often abbreviated to Pam. Pamela is also infrequently used as a surname.

History
Sir Philip Sidney invented the name Pamela for a pivotal character in his epic prose work, The Countess of Pembroke's Arcadia, written in the late 16th century and published posthumously. The name is widely taken to mean "all sweetness", formed on the Greek words πᾶν pan ("all") and μέλι meli ("honey"), but there is no evidence regarding what meaning, if any, Sidney intended for it.

The Samuel Richardson novel Pamela in 1740 or 1741 inaugurated the use of Pamela as a given name but it was not in common usage until the 20th century. A rare early bearer of the name, Lady Edward FitzGerald (c. 1773 – 1831), although known by the first name Pamela, was born Stephanie Caroline Anne Syms.

The name's popularity may have been hindered by the tendency to pronounce it   which was not fully superseded by the now-standard   until the start of the 20th century when the name finally entered general usage. Pamela was very popular in Great Britain from the 1930s through the 1950s with the tallies of the most popular names for British newborn girls for the respective years 1934, 1944 and 1954 ranking Pamela at respectively #20, #17 and #24. Evidently less popular from the 1960s—being ranked on the respective 1964 tally at #67—the name Pamela has grown increasingly unfashionable, with a reported total of eleven newborn girls in Britain given the name in 2009. The name was similarly most used throughout the Anglosphere from the 1940s through the mid-1970s. For instance, it was among the one hundred most used names for girls in the United States between 1943 and 1976 and remained among the one thousand most used names for American girls until 2011. It has since declined in use.

Given name
People with the name or its variants include:

 Pamela Adlon, née Segall
 Pamela Anderson
 Pamela Bellwood
 Pamela J. Bjorkman
 Pamella Bordes
 Pamela Branch, British crime novelist
 Pamela Britton
 Pamela Brown, multiple people
 Pamela Brooks
 Pamela Bustin
 Pamela Butchart, Scottish children's author
 Pamela Carruthers
 Pamela Chopra
 Pamela Clabburn
 Pamela Copus
 Pamela Courson
 Pamela Kyle Crossley
 Pamela Crowe
 Pamela Cundell
 Pamela Dean
 Pamela Des Barres, born Pamela Ann Miller
 Pamela Duncan (novelist)
 Pamela Duncan (actress)
 Pamelyn Ferdin (or "Pamela Lynn"), child actress, animal rights activist
 Pamela Fitzgerald (disambiguation), multiple people
 Pamela Frank
 Pamela Frankau
 Pamela Franklin
 Pamela Gay, American astronomer
 Pamela Geller
 Pamela Gemin
 Pamela Gidley
 Pamela Gorkin, American mathematician
 Pamela Green, English model and actress
 Pamela Green (DJ)
 Pamela Gordon (actress), American actress
 Pamela Gordon (politician), Bermudian politician
 Pamela Anne Gordon, Canadian model
 Pamela Harmsworth, Viscountess Rothermere
 Pamela Harriman
 Pamela Hayden
 Pamela Healy
 Pamela Hensley
 Lady Pamela Hicks
 Pamela Isaacs
 Pamela Jelimo
 Pamela Hansford Johnson
 Pamela Jones
 Pamela Joyner (born 1957/58), American art collector
 Pamela S. Karlan
 Pamela Katz
 Pamela M. Kilmartin
 Pamela Kirkham, 16th Baroness Berners
 Pamela Klassen
 Pamela Knaack
 Pamela Kunz
 Pamela Kurrell
 Pamela Levy
 Pamela London
 Pamela Martin (disambiguation), multiple people
 Pamela Sue Martin
 Pamela Melroy
 Pamela Morris
 Pamela Munro
 Pamela O'Malley, Irish-Spanish bohemian, educationalist and radical
 Pamela Pasinetti (born 1993), Thai-Italian model and beauty pageant titleholder
 Pamela Payton-Wright
 Pamela Rabe
 Pamela Rambo
 Pamela Ramljak
 Pamela C. Rasmussen
 Pamela Reed
 Pamela Ribon
 Pamela Rooks
 Pamela Salem
 Pamela Samuelson
 Pamela Sargent
 Pamela Sharples
 Pamela Susan Shoop
 Pamela Silver
 Pamela Smart
 Pamela Colman Smith
 Pamela Spence
 Pamela Springsteen
 Pamela Stein
 Pamela Stephenson
 Pamela Tiffin 
 Pamela Lyndon "P. L." Travers
 Pamela Rogers Turner (born 1977), teacher and child rapist
 Pamela Vitale
 Pamela Wallin
 Pamela Willeford
 Pamela Williams
 Pamela Wynne
 Pamela Zoline

Surname
 Lucia Pamela

Fictional characters
 Pamela, one of the Thea Sisters in Thea Stilton
 Pamela Andrews, heroine of Samuel Richardson's novel Pamela, or Virtue Rewarded (1740–1741)
 Dr. Pamela Lillian Isley or Poison Ivy, character in DC Comics and enemy of Batman
 Pamela Voorhees, in the Friday the 13th films
 Pamela Barnes Ewing, in TV series Dallas
 Pamela Abbott, one of the Abbott sisters in the movie, Inventing the Abbotts
 Pamela Douglas, from soap opera The Bold and the Beautiful
 Pamela Ibis, a recurring character from the Atelier series of video games.
 Pamela Moran, a main character in Army Wives
 Pamela Byrnes (later Focker), a main character in the Meet the Parents film trilogy
 Pamela Beesly, from the sitcom The Office
 Pamela Swynford De Beaufort, from the HBO TV series, True Blood.

See also
 Pam (disambiguation)
 List of Wikipedia articles starting with Pamela
 List of Wikipedia articles starting with Pam

References

English given names
English feminine given names
English given names invented by fiction writers